This is a list of events from British radio in 1926.

Events
16 January – A British Broadcasting Company radio play by Ronald Knox about workers' revolution in London causes a panic among those who have not heard the preliminary announcement that it is a satire on broadcasting.
4 May – The British Broadcasting Company broadcasts five news bulletins a day as no newspapers are published due to the general strike.
7 October – The first edition of Choral Evensong is relayed by the British Broadcasting Company from Westminster Abbey; it will still be broadcast regularly as of 2022 as the BBC's longest-running outside broadcast programme.
31 December – The British Broadcasting Company is dissolved and its assets transferred to the non-commercial and crown-chartered British Broadcasting Corporation.

Births
22 February – Kenneth Williams, comic actor (died 1988)
19 May – David Jacobs, broadcast presenter (died 2013)
23 May – Desmond Carrington, disc jockey and actor (died 2017)
27 August – Pat Coombs, comic stooge (died 2002)
8 September – Ronald Mason, radio drama producer (died 1997)
31 October – Jimmy Savile, disc jockey, broadcast presenter, philanthropist and serial sex offender (died 2011)

References 

 
Years in British radio
Radio